Japan competed at the 1997 East Asian Games held in Busan, South Korea from May 10, 1997, to May 19, 1997. The country finished second behind China with 47 gold medals, 53 silver medals, and 53 bronze medals.

References

East Asian Games
1997 East Asian Games
Japan at the East Asian Games